The 2020 Houston Cougars football team represented the University of Houston in the 2020 NCAA Division I FBS football season. The Cougars played their home games at TDECU Stadium in Houston, Texas, and competed in the American Athletic Conference. They were led by second-year head coach Dana Holgorsen.

Previous season

The Cougars finished the 2019 season 4–8, 2–6 in AAC play to finish in a tie for fifth place in the West Division. They did not qualify for postseason play.

Preseason

Recruiting class
References:

|}

AAC preseason media poll
The preseason Poll was released September 1

Roster

Schedule
The 2020 Houston schedule, as originally released, was to consist of six home and four away games in the regular season. The Cougars were to play host to conference foes Tulane, UCF, South Florida, and Tulsa, and to travel to conference opponents Memphis, Navy, Cincinnati, and SMU.

The Cougars were scheduled to host two non-conference games, against North Texas (C-USA) and BYU (an FBS Independent). The home game against Rice was postponed on August 10, after Rice announced it was delaying the start of the season until September 26.

Houston had a game scheduled against Washington State, which was canceled due to the COVID-19 pandemic.

On September 12 the American announced that the Houston/Memphis game scheduled for September 18 was postponed due to positive COVID-19 cases at Memphis, As a result of the Houston at Memphis game postponement, Houston was able to add a game at Baylor scheduled for September 19. On September 18, Baylor announced that the Houston versus Baylor game would be postponed due to Baylor not meeting the Big 12 Conference COVID-19 game cancellation thresholds.

After experiencing several COVID-19 cases through September 23, the North Texas Mean Green canceled the September 26 game against the Cougars.

Schedule Source:

Game summaries

Tulane

BYU

at Navy

UCF

at Cincinnati

South Florida

at Memphis

vs. Hawaii (New Mexico Bowl)

Rankings

Players drafted into the NFL

References

Houston
Houston Cougars football seasons
Houston Cougars football